St. John’s West is a provincial electoral district for the House of Assembly of Newfoundland and Labrador, Canada. As of 2011, there are 7,741 eligible voters living within the district.

The district is largely residential and middle class and includes the Cowan Heights area. Prior to 1956, the district was larger and elected two MHAs.

The district is represented by Cabinet Minister Siobhan Coady.

From 1949 to 1975, it elected two MLAs through Block voting. Since 1975 it has elected a single MLA through First past the post.

Members of the House of Assembly
The district has elected the following Members of the House of Assembly:

Election results 

|-

|-

|-
 
|NDP
|Raj Sharan
|align="right"|460
|align="right"|7.29
|align="right"|
|}

 
|NDP
|Pat Lynch
|align="right"|683
|align="right"|10.6
|align="right"|
|}

 
|NDP
|Pat Lynch
|align="right"|651
|align="right"|
|align="right"|
|-
|}

 
|NDP
|Bonnie MacGillivray
|align="right"|835
|align="right"|
|align="right"|
|-
|}

 
|NDP
|Larry Power
|align="right"|380
|align="right"|
|align="right"|
|-
|}

 
|NDP
|Thomas O'Leary
|align="right"|1,508
|align="right"|
|align="right"|
|-
|}

 
|NDP
|Ronald Lewis
|align="right"|225
|align="right"|
|align="right"|
|-
|}

References

External links 
Website of the Newfoundland and Labrador House of Assembly

Newfoundland and Labrador provincial electoral districts
Politics of St. John's, Newfoundland and Labrador